David Linde (born February 8, 1960) is the CEO of the Los Angeles, California-based film production company Participant, a position to which he was appointed in October 2015. Prior to his role at Participant, Linde had leading roles at Universal Pictures, Focus Features, Good Machine, and Lava Bear Films, where films released during his tenures collectively earned more than $14 billion globally, with 158 Oscar nominations and 34 wins.

Early life and education
Linde was born and raised in Eugene, the son of law professor and Oregon Supreme Court Justice, Hans A. Linde and Helen Tucker Linde. His father was Jewish and his mother is Presbyterian. In 1978, Linde graduated from South Eugene High School. After attending Swarthmore College, he moved to New York City where his girlfriend (later his wife) had moved. In New York, he worked as a paralegal for Paramount Pictures from 1984-1988 where he supervised sales of select international theatrical rights at Paramount Pictures; and then as co-head of the international department at Fox Lorber Associates from 1988-1991 where he directed the sales of more than 300 independently produced film, documentary and television titles.

Career
Linde joined Miramax Films in 1991 as Vice President of Acquisitions before being promoted to Executive Vice President and Head of Sales as the founding executive of Miramax Films International. While at Miramax, he oversaw the international distribution of Quentin Tarantino's Pulp Fiction, Woody Allen's Mighty Aphrodite, Wes Craven's Scream and Anthony Minghella's multi-Academy Award-winning The English Patient.

Linde served as both co-president and partner of the production company Good Machine and President and founder of Good Machine International, beginning in January 1997. GMI handled the international distribution of films including Ang Lee's Crouching Tiger, Hidden Dragon (of which Linde was executive producer), Alfonso Cuaron's Y tu mamá también (of which Linde was executive producer). Joel Coen and Ethan Coen's The Man Who Wasn't There, and Todd Field's In the Bedroom. Films distributed by GMI earned six Academy Awards from 22 nominations, including two for Best Picture and five Golden Globes from 18 nominations.  While at Good Machine, Linde also executive produced Todd Solondz's Happiness. In 2002, Linde and his partners sold the Good Machine companies to Universal Pictures and created Focus Features.

As co-president of Focus Features and president of its genre production unit, Rogue Pictures. Linde oversaw a slate that featured Roman Polanski's The Pianist, Sofia Coppola's Lost in Translation and Fernando Meirelles' The Constant Gardener, as well as Ang Lee's Brokeback Mountain. During Linde's tenure at Focus, the company was honored with 53 Oscar nominations resulting in 11 Academy Awards.  In 2008, Linde oversaw the sale of Rogue Pictures to Relativity Media.

In 2002, Linde was promoted to co-chairman of Universal Pictures and subsequently, Chairman. During his tenure, Universal significantly grew its international distribution and production platform across all media and launched Universal's family/animation banner, Illumination Entertainment.

In 2011, Linde founded Lava Bear Films, a film production and financing company developing projects specifically designed for the global marketplace, and served as the company's CEO.

Linde has long-lasting relationships in global filmmaking, most recently serving as executive producer of Alejandro González Iñárritu's Academy Award-nominated Biutiful, producer of Fernando Meirelles' 360, and as executive producer of Zhang Yimou's The Flowers of War starring Christian Bale. Most recently, Linde executive produced Yimou's Coming Home which premiered at the 2014 Cannes Film Festival, Jonas Cuaron's Desierto, and Alfonso Cuaron’s Roma.

Since joining Participant as its CEO in 2015, Linde has overseen two best picture Academy Award winners — Green Book and Spotlight — along with a best documentary feature Oscar for American Factory and two best foreign-language Oscars for Roma and A Fantastic Woman. He also expanded the company’s content approach to include episodic television series and digital short form video through the acquisition of SoulPancake. In September 2019, Participant extended Linde’s contract as CEO with a multi-year deal.

Filmography 
He was producer for all films unless otherwise noted.

Film

Thanks

Television

Recognition
Throughout his career Linde has been recognized with numerous awards including The Will Rogers Motion Picture Pioneer of the Year, General Electric’s chairman’s Award for Performance Turnaround, the Anti-Defamation League’s Distinguished Entertainment Industry Award, the 21st Israel Film Festival – Visionary Award, New York Magazine: Best Of The Industry Award, the Gotham Award For Distinguished Achievement, the EmPOWerment Award at Variety’s Power of Women event, among others. In 2020, Linde received an honorary degree from Swarthmore College. Linde serves on the Academy of Motion Picture Arts and Sciences’ Board of Governors, on Film Independent's Board of Directors, and on American Film Institute's Board of Trustees.

Personal life
Linde is married to Felicia Rosenfeld.

References

External links 
 

Living people
20th-century American Jews
American entertainment industry businesspeople
Swarthmore College alumni
Businesspeople from Eugene, Oregon
South Eugene High School alumni
Film producers from Oregon
1960 births
American independent film production company founders
21st-century American Jews